Bionics is the application of biological methods and systems found in nature to the study and design of engineering systems and modern technology.

Bionic(s) may also refer to:

Technology

Implants and prosthetic devices
 Bionic contact lens, being developed to provide a virtual display
 Visual prosthesis, often referred to as a bionic eye, an experimental device intended to restore functional vision
 Cochlear implant, often referred to as a bionic ear, provides a sense of sound to a person who is profoundly deaf or severely hard of hearing

Other technology
 Bionic (software), a standard C library developed for the Android embedded system
 Motorola Droid Bionic, a cell phone running the Android operating system
 Mercedes-Benz Bionic, a concept car first introduced in 2005

Film and television
A fictionalized cybernetic augmentation science called "bionics" was a key plot point in a television franchise based on the 1972 novel Cyborg by Martin Caidin:
 The Six Million Dollar Man, a 1973 television series starring Lee Majors
 The Bionic Woman, a 1976 series starring Lindsay Wagner 
 The Return of the Six Million Dollar Man and the Bionic Woman, a 1987 television movie
 Bionic Showdown: The Six Million Dollar Man and the Bionic Woman, a 1989 television movie
 Bionic Ever After?, a 1994 television movie
 Bionic Woman (2007 TV series), a reboot of the 1976 series

Music
 Bionic (Christina Aguilera album)
 Bionic (Sandbox album)
 "Bionic" (Christina Aguilera song)
 "Bionic" (King Adora song)

Design and architecture
 Bionic architecture, a design movement
 Bionic Tower, a proposed vertical city

See also